John McHugh (13 August 1909 – 9 October 1966) was a Scottish professional footballer who played as a goalkeeper. McGregor was playing for Burnbank Athletic before signing for Dundee United in 1928 following Bill Paterson's transfer to Arsenal. He made his United debut in February 1928, sharing goalkeeping duties with Alex Johnstone during the 1927–28 season. He became the second choice keeper for the 1928–29 season and helped the side to promotion, winning the Scottish Second Division championship, although he also spent time on loan at Montrose. During the First Division campaign that followed, McHugh became first choice again and attracted interest from Portsmouth, signing for the club in November 1930 for a fee of £400. McHugh went on to play for Watford and had a loan spell with Southend United during his time at Vicarage Road.

Honours
Dundee United
Scottish Second Division: 1
 1928–29

References

1909 births
1966 deaths
Scottish footballers
Burnbank Athletic F.C. players
Scottish Junior Football Association players
Dundee United F.C. players
Montrose F.C. players
Portsmouth F.C. players
Watford F.C. players
Southend United F.C. players
Scottish Football League players
English Football League players
Association football goalkeepers
Footballers from Hamilton, South Lanarkshire